Raipur is a village in Parbhani taluka of Parbhani district of Maharashtra state in India.

Demography
According to the 2011 census of India, Raipur had a population of 1442, of which 765 were male and 677 were female. The average sex ratio of the village was 885, which was lower than the Maharashtra state average of 929. The literacy rate was 76.97% compared to 82.3% for the state. Male literacy rate was 87% while female literacy rate was 65%.

Geography and Transport
Following table shows distance of Raipur from some of major cities.

References

Villages in Parbhani district